The 1970 Formula One season was the 24th season of the FIA's Formula One motor racing. It featured the 21st World Championship of Drivers and the 13th International Cup for F1 Manufacturers. Thirteen races were held between 7 March and 25 October, with the Drivers' Championship won by Jochen Rindt and the Constructors' title by Lotus. Rindt died four races before the end of the season, but had earned enough World Championship points that no other driver managed to surpass his total by the end of the season. It is the only season to date in which the World Drivers' Championship title had been awarded posthumously. Jacky Ickx driving for Ferrari finished the season strongly, but his low 4th-place finish in the penultimate round ensured that Rindt's title lead would stand. In the end, all of Rindt's 45 points came from his five wins in the season.

Teams and drivers 
The following teams and drivers competed in the 1970  World Championship.

Calendar

Calendar changes
The Belgian Grand Prix returned in 1970 after the 1969 race was cancelled after the drivers boycotted the Grand Prix because of the extreme dangers of the Circuit de Spa-Francorchamps. Major safety changes had been made to it for 1970.

The Spanish Grand Prix was moved from Montjuïc to Jarama, in keeping with the event-sharing arrangement between the two circuits.

The British Grand Prix was moved from Silverstone to Brands Hatch, in keeping with the event-sharing arrangement between the two circuits.

The German Grand Prix was originally to be held at the Nürburgring but the drivers refused to race at the 'Ring in the condition it was in' unless major safety changes were made to it. The Nurburgring track officials responded negatively to a list of changes requested by the drivers. The Hockenheimring would host the race in 1970 on its intended date.

The Austrian Grand Prix hosted its second Grand Prix in 1970, the race was held for the first time at the Österreichring on 16 August.

The Canadian Grand Prix was moved from Mosport Park to Circuit Mont-Tremblant, in keeping with the event-sharing arrangement between the two circuits.

Season review

For the 1970 Formula One season, following an agreement with Simca, Tyrrell were asked by Matra to use their V12 rather than the Cosworth. Stewart tested the Matra V12 and found it inferior to the DFV. As a large part of the Tyrrell budget was provided by Ford, and another significant element came from French state-owned petroleum company Elf (which had an agreement with Renault that precluded supporting a Simca partner), Ken Tyrrell had little alternative (due to clashing sponsorship deals) but to buy the March 701 chassis as an interim solution while developing his own car in secret with the first Tyrrell bearing a substantial resemblance to the MS80.

The new wedge-shaped Lotus 72 had very innovative car design, featuring torsion bar suspension, hip-mounted radiators, inboard front brakes and an overhanging rear wing. The 72 originally had suspension problems, but when dive and squat were designed out of the suspension the car quickly showed its superiority. Lotus's new leader, the Austrian Jochen Rindt, dominated the championship until he was killed at Monza when he crashed into some poorly installed crash barriers right before the Parabolica corner. He took the 1970 title posthumously for Lotus. Jacky Ickx won the Austrian, Canadian and Mexican Grands Prix to come second in the Drivers' Championship, having re-joined Ferrari from Brabham. Had he won the United States Grand Prix instead of Brazilian newcomer Emerson Fittipaldi, Ickx would have been crowned champion.

The 1970 season was one of the most tragic in Formula One history. Before Rindt's death at Monza, New Zealander Bruce McLaren was killed testing a McLaren Can-Am car at the Goodwood Circuit in England, and Briton Piers Courage was killed at the Dutch Grand Prix at Zandvoort, driving a Frank Williams-entered De Tomaso.

1970 saw the introduction of slick tyres by Goodyear.

After a Formula One career which began at the 1955 British Grand Prix, triple World Champion Jack Brabham retired at the end of the year.

Race 1: South Africa

The first round was the South Africa Grand Prix held at the Kyalami circuit between Johannesburg and Pretoria. Jack Brabham won the race in a Brabham BT33.

Race 2: Spain 

The Spanish Grand Prix took place on the Jarama circuit. The defending champion Jackie Stewart won in a March 701.

Race 3: Monaco
The Monaco Grand Prix ended in a close finish. At the last corner of the last lap, Jack Brabham skidded off the track, allowing Austrian Jochen Rindt in a Lotus 49 to pass and win the race.

Race 4: Belgium 

Formula One had recently lost one of its top drivers: Bruce McLaren had been killed testing a Can-Am car at the Goodwood circuit in southern England. But the F1 circus had returned to a wild and dangerous place: the notorious  ultra-fast Spa-Francorchamps circuit had returned to the calendar for the 1970 season after some safety upgrades, including steel Armco barriers now lined around the circuit. A chicane had also been inserted at the incredibly fast Malmedy corner to reduce speeds onto the Masta straight. The field only consisted of 18 entrants; Spa often had a small number of entrants compared to other circuits because most racing drivers in Europe were frightened of the circuit and did not like racing there. Stewart took pole, followed by New Zealander Chris Amon and Rindt. Rindt took the lead going into Eau Rouge, and once the cars came back around towards La Source, Amon was leading. Then, Stewart took the lead, but then retired his March-Ford/Cosworth with engine problems. Amon took the lead, but Mexican Pedro Rodríguez in a BRM was making the most of his BRM engine's V12 power, and he and Amon battled until the 28th and last lap – and Rodriguez beat the perennially unlucky Amon to the checkered flag by a mere 1.1 seconds. Frenchman Jean-Pierre Beltoise took the final podium spot, followed by home favorite Jacky Ickx in a Ferrari. But this was the last time the old triangle-shaped Spa was to be used for Formula One – the circuit proved to be just too fast and dangerous, even with safety modifications. The Belgian Grand Prix was originally scheduled to be on the following year's calendar, but was taken off the calendar after the circuit was not up to FIA-newly mandated safety specs. The race would move to Nivelles and Zolder.

Race 5: The Netherlands 

The Dutch Grand Prix of 1970 saw the revolutionary Lotus 72 stamp its authority on the Formula One scene. Although the car made its debut at Spa with John Miles, the car was still not properly finished. But for the Dutch event, it was – and Jochen Rindt dominated this weekend by taking pole and leading from start to finish on the fast, beachside Zandvoort circuit. But the race itself was marred by the fatal accident of Briton Piers Courage in a Frank Williams-entered DeTomaso-Ford/Cosworth. Courage crashed at the very fast Tunnel Oost corner, and one of the wheels hit him in the head and killed him instantly. After the car had crashed, it then caught fire, as was so common in those days.

Race 6: France 

Formula One then went to the 5.1 mile Charade circuit, made up entirely of closed-off public roads located around an extinct volcano overlooking the small city of Clermont-Ferrand. Practice and qualifying were both eventful – in addition to Ferrari showing improved form by Jacky Ickx taking pole, the circuit was littered with rocks and Rindt – already made nauseous by the twisty and roller-coaster-type nature of the circuit – was hit in the face by a rock thrown from another car – in those days, drivers wore open-face helmets covered by a white rag to protect them from the gas fumes. Ickx took the lead from the start, but he retired with engine damage, and Frenchman Beltoise – driving an all-French Matra – was in the lead. However, due to the rocks on the track, Beltoise punctured a tire, and had to come in. This gave Rindt the lead, ahead of Chris Amon. Rindt won from Amon and Brabham.

Race 7: Great Britain 

The British Grand Prix alternated between the very fast, flat, smooth Silverstone circuit and the twisty, undulating and rough Brands Hatch, just outside London. For 1970, the British GP was at Brands Hatch, and it was an exciting race – Jack Brabham was leading at the start, but he ran out of fuel at the last bend – and Rindt overtook him and won his 3rd consecutive race. After the race, Rindt's Lotus was disqualified for not meeting the maximum rear wing height -after the car had been brought back to the Lotus garage, the team appealed, the car was reviewed again (having been out of parc ferme for a while) and this time it was declared within the regulations, returning the win to Rindt.

Race 8: Germany 

The German Grand Prix was held at the Hockenheimring for 1970. It had originally been scheduled to be run at the very long and notoriously dangerous Nurburgring Nordschleife, but the drivers refused to race at the 'Ring in the condition it was in – unless major safety changes were made to it. There was a driver's meeting at the Dorchester Hotel in London after the memorial services for Bruce McLaren and Piers Courage, and the drivers, already under considerable pressure and motivated by a normally quiet Jack Brabham – voted not to race there after the German GP organizers responded negatively to a list of changes requested by the drivers. The Hockenheimring was very fast, and it generated a great race – Jochen Rindt and Jacky Ickx battled all throughout the race and Rindt won yet again – and it was clear at this point who the two main title contenders were going to be.

Race 9: Austria 

The second Formula One Austrian Grand Prix was the first held at the fast and spectacular Österreichring – in 1964, it had been held at the unpopular Zeltweg Airfield. The year-old Styrian circuit played host to Ferrari dominance – their first victory since 1968. Jacky Ickx and Clay Regazzoni easily finished 1–2; the Ferrari 312B had become a competitive package, although this was not done by Ickx, who did not like testing and often preferred to use his driving skill to deal with a car's shortcomings.

Race 10: Italy 

Monza was an ultra-fast circuit with no chicanes of any kind, and the weekend was marred by the death of Jochen Rindt, who was killed on the straight going into the Parabolica on his wingless Lotus 72. Aerodynamic downforce was not yet properly understood, and the car was, according to his teammate John Miles, rather unstable and difficult to drive. Ultimately though, it was a brake system failure that caused Rindt to spin off and crash into a poorly installed Armco barrier: the car went under the barrier and rotated a few times in the sand trap. Rindt's belts were loose, and he was not wearing a crotch strap belt, a recent introduction. As a result, he slipped down in the car and the belt buckle caused fatal throat injuries. Ferrari driver Clay Regazzoni won his first Formula One race, and the overjoyed crowd ran onto the track and celebrated.

Race 11: Canada 

The F1 season concluded with a 3-part North American tour, which started in Canada at the spectacular Mont-Tremblant circuit in Quebec near the town of St. Jovite – the second and last time F1 would race there. The Lotus team did not show up, and although Jackie Stewart dominated practice in his new Tyrrell-Ford/Cosworth 001, he retired due to mechanical problems, and Ickx took victory in his Ferrari.

Race 12: United States
The United States Grand Prix at Watkins Glen saw the return of the Lotus team, and Brazilian newcomer Emerson Fittipaldi, who had become their lead driver after Rindt's death, was competitive throughout. He was challenged by Mexican Pedro Rodriguez, wanting to win again after his Spa triumph four months earlier. Rodriguez led but ran out of fuel, and although he stormed through the track, Fittipaldi was able to hold on to win his first Formula One championship race. This was the last F1 race at the original Watkins Glen permanent race track – the circuit was rebuilt for the following year. Rindt posthumously won the Drivers' Championship at this race – Ickx needed to win to stand a chance of overtaking Rindt's points total, but finished fourth after mechanical problems.

Race 13: Mexico 

The last race of the Formula One World Championship was the Mexican Grand Prix at the Magdalena Mixhuca Park in Mexico City. The event proved troublesome – some 200,000 people showed up to watch, and a number of them were actually sitting right next to the track asphalt, over the barriers. This delayed the race start for over an hour – after Rodriguez and Stewart pleaded with the crowd to move back, which they did – but not very far. The race finally got underway – and Ickx won again for Ferrari, as Stewart retired after hitting a stray dog. But the crowd's shenanigans caused by the disorganization of the event caused the Mexican Grand Prix to be cancelled for the following year, and it did not come back until 1986 to the same circuit.

Results and standings

Grands Prix

World Drivers' Championship standings

Points were awarded on a 9–6–4–3–2–1 basis to the first six finishers at each race. The best six results from the first seven rounds and the best five results from the last six rounds were retained.

† Jochen Rindt suffered a fatal accident in practice before the Italian Grand Prix.

‡ Piers Courage suffered a fatal accident during the Dutch Grand Prix.

International Cup for F1 Manufacturers standings

Points were awarded on a 9–6–4–3–2–1 basis to the first six finishers at each round, however only the best placed car from each manufacturer was eligible to score points. The best six results from the first seven rounds and the best five results from the last six rounds were retained.

Bold results counted to championship totals.

Non-championship races
Other Formula One races held in 1970, which did not count towards the World Championship. The International Trophy and Gold Cup were held concurrently with Formula 5000 cars.

Notes

References

External links
 1970 World Championship results and images from f1-facts.com

Formula One seasons